Aldo Bertoldi (born 5 January 1961) is a Swiss racewalker. He competed in the men's 50 kilometres walk at the 1992 Summer Olympics.

References

1961 births
Living people
Athletes (track and field) at the 1992 Summer Olympics
Swiss male racewalkers
Olympic athletes of Switzerland
Place of birth missing (living people)